Harbinger, in comics, may refer to:

 Harbinger (DC Comics), a character in Crisis on Infinite Earths who has since appeared in the Arrow TV series
 Harbinger of Apocalypse, a fictional character in Cable from Marvel Comics
 Harbinger, a name used in Valiant Comics:
 Harbinger (comic book), a comic book published by Valiant Comics
 Harbingers (comics), fictional characters in Valiant Comics
 Harbinger Resistance, a fictional organisation in titles from Valiant Comics

See also
Harbinger (disambiguation)